The composition of Seanad Éireann, one of the two houses of the Oireachtas (parliament) of Ireland, is set out in Article 18 of the Constitution of Ireland. This provides for 60 Senators, of whom 11 are nominated by the Taoiseach who is appointed next after the election to general election to Dáil Éireann (Ireland's house of representatives).

These nominations allow the government to reach a majority in the Seanad, for smaller parties in coalition or supporting the government to achieve more significant Seanad representation, and for the appointment of Independent members to represent particular interests. A number of representatives from Northern Ireland have been selected over the years as Independent senators, and in 2016, Enda Kenny nominated Billy Lawless, a resident of Chicago, to represent the interest of the Irish diaspora.

As the outgoing Seanad continues in session after the general election, it is common for the outgoing Taoiseach to appoint Senators to fill the places of those who were elected to Dáil Éireann for the short period until the conclusion of the Seanad election.

Of the remaining 49 senators, six are elected by university graduates (3 for the National University and 3 for Dublin University), and 43 are elected across 5 Vocational panels by Oireachtas members and city and county councillors.

Senators

Changes

References

See also 
 :Category:Nominated members of Seanad Éireann

 
Seanad Eireann Nominated by the Taoiseach
Members of Seanad Éireann